Group 2 of UEFA Euro 1988 contained the Soviet Union, the Netherlands, the Republic of Ireland, and England. Matches were played from 12 to 18 June 1988.

England lost three games from three.

Teams

Standings

In the semi-finals,
The winner of Group 2, Soviet Union, advanced to play the runner-up of Group 1, Italy.
The runner-up of Group 2, Netherlands, advanced to play the winner of Group 1, West Germany.

Matches

England vs Republic of Ireland

Netherlands vs Soviet Union

England vs Netherlands

Republic of Ireland vs Soviet Union

England vs Soviet Union

Republic of Ireland vs Netherlands

References

External links
UEFA Euro 1988 Group 2

UEFA Euro 1988
Group
Group
Group
Group